Cryptostylis ovata, commonly known as the slipper orchid or western tongue orchid, is an orchid endemic to Western Australia. It is a common, summer flowering species with dark green leaves with a white central vein and up to fifteen pale greenish flowers with a brownish red labellum with a network of darker veins.

Description
Cryptostylis ovata is a terrestrial, perennial, deciduous, herb which usually grows in colonies although only a few plants may flower in any one year. The leaves are dark green with a central white vein on the upper surface and purplish red below. This species is the only orchid in Western Australia to have leaves throughout the year. Flowering occurs from November to February.

Taxonomy and naming
Cryptostylis ovata was first formally described in 1810 by Robert Brown and the description was published in Prodromus Florae Novae Hollandiae et Insulae Van Diemen. The specific epithet (ovata) is a Latin word meaning "egg-shaped", referring to the shape of the leaves.

Distribution and habitat
The slipper orchid is widespread and common in a wide range of habitats from coastal scrub to high rainfall forests. It is mainly found between Perth and Albany but sometimes further east, in the Esperance Plains, Jarrah Forest, Swan Coastal Plain and Warren biogeographic regions.

References

External links 

ovata
Endemic orchids of Australia
Orchids of Western Australia
Plants described in 1810
Taxa named by Robert Brown (botanist, born 1773)